Razaq Akanni Adegbite (born 20 December 1992) is a Nigerian professional footballer who plays as a forward.

Club career
Adegbite Razaq started his playing career with Karamone youth team later joined Gateway United, before he later joined Enugu Rangers. Razaq has a brother also  playing professional football in Nigeria Professional League known as Adegbite Alhameen Adeniyi who also started his football youth career with Karamone.

In 2012 Enugu Rangers warned Enyimba Internstional off, but Adegbite decided to join Enyimba International, Jomo Cosmos (working permit delay) and cancellation of deal with Kahramanspor due to disagreement of transfer clauses then returned to Nigeria to extend his contract with Enugu Rangers. He went on to sign a  deal with  Kano Pillars within 2016 and 2017. He joined Cyprus based club Doğan Türk Birliği in 2017.

In 2018, he signed in for Primeiro de Agosto and in 2018–19, he was loaned to Desportivo da Huíla in Angola's premier league, the Girabola.

Razaq joined Desportivo da Huíla on loan in 2019. In the summer 2019, he joined Tunisian club US Tataouine but left the club a few months later and returned to Nigeria to join Sunshine Stars. In January 2020, he returned to Turkish Cypriot club Doğan Türk Birliği.

On 2 November 2020, it was announced that Razaq had joined Hong Kong Premier League club Happy Valley.

International career
Razaq has earned 6 appearances, scoring 3 goals for the Nigeria U-17. Rasaq has also earned 7 appearances, scoring 4 goals for the Nigeria U-20. In 2014, the striker was invited by the Nigeria national football team in an international friendly match.

CAF Champions League
He had featured for Enugu Rangers International FC in the 2012–13 CAF Champions League and Enyimba in 2013–14 respectively. He was swapped to Enyimba International F.C. when Enyimba needed him badly and replaced with Ifeanyi Ede to Enugu Rangers.

References

External links
 Razaq Adegbite Returns - Savid News
 

1992 births
Living people
Nigerian footballers
Nigerian expatriate footballers
Gateway United F.C. players
Rangers International F.C. players
Enyimba F.C. players
Sunshine Stars F.C. players
Kano Pillars F.C. players
C.D. Huíla players
C.D. Primeiro de Agosto players
US Tataouine players
Doğan Türk Birliği footballers
Happy Valley AA players
Nigeria Professional Football League players
Hong Kong Premier League players
Association football forwards
Nigerian expatriate sportspeople in Angola
Nigerian expatriate sportspeople in Cyprus
Nigerian expatriate sportspeople in Tunisia
Nigerian expatriate sportspeople in Hong Kong
Expatriate footballers in Angola
Expatriate footballers in Cyprus
Expatriate footballers in Tunisia
Expatriate footballers in Hong Kong